Tom Violette (born October 26, 1960) is an American curler from Issaquah, Washington and Stevens Point, Wisconsin.

Teams

Personal life
Tom Violette started curling in 1974, when he was 14 years old.

His son Luc Violette is a curler too. He played for United States in four  and at the 2019 Winter Universiade.

References

External links

Living people
1960 births
American male curlers
American curling champions
People from Issaquah, Washington
People from Stevens Point, Wisconsin
Sportspeople from King County, Washington
Sportspeople from Wisconsin